Doonga or Dunga (translation: डूँगा) is a surname for Hindus.

References

 Imperial Gazetteer of India.
 Forebears.

Names
Surnames